Reuben is a novel by the American writer John Edgar Wideman set in Pittsburgh, Pennsylvania during the 1980s.

The novel tells the story of Reuben, an aging African-American man who lives in an abandoned trailer, but is a lawyer and go-between on behalf of poor blacks in Homewood, a neighborhood of the East End.

Sources
 Contemporary Authors Online. The Gale Group, 2005.

1987 American novels
Novels set in Pittsburgh
Henry Holt and Company books
African-American novels
Novels by John Edgar Wideman